Köýtendag Range (also Koytendag Range or Kugitangtau Range) is a spur of the Pamir-Alay mountains in the south-east of Turkmenistan, extending along the border with Uzbekistan's Surxondaryo Region.

The Köýtendag Nature Reserve is located within the range.

References
 "Kugitangtau", Encyclopædia Britannica Online, 2008. Retrieved on 2008-12-28.
 "Kugitangtau", Big Soviet Encyclopedia Online . Retrieved on 2008-12-28.
 Nature reserve in Koytendag Mountains

Mountains of Turkmenistan
Mountain ranges of Uzbekistan